Javier Sebastián Gazol Condón (born 27 October 1980 in Zaragoza), known as Javier Gazol, is a Spanish pole vaulter. Representing his nation Spain in the men's pole vault at the 2004 Summer Olympics, Gazol cleared a height at 5.60 metres to set his own personal best from the Spanish Championships in Almería. Throughout his sporting career, Gazol trained for the track and field club Transbaso Monzón Polidux, under his personal coach Hans Ruf.

Gazol qualified for the Spanish squad as a lone athlete in the men's pole vault at the 2004 Summer Olympics in Athens. Nearly a week before the Games commenced, Gazol improved his personal best and an Olympic B-standard of 5.60 m to earn a spot on the Spanish team at the national championships in Almería. Gazol successfully vaulted 5.30 m on his first attempt, but failed to raise the bar at a targeted height of 5.50 m after three straight misses, leaving him in a twenty-eighth place draw with Czech Republic's Štěpán Janáček and Australia's Steven Hooker at the end of the qualifying round.

Notes

References

External links
 
 
 

1980 births
Living people
Spanish male pole vaulters
Olympic athletes of Spain
Athletes (track and field) at the 2004 Summer Olympics
Sportspeople from Zaragoza